KGJT may refer to:

 the ICAO code for Grand Junction Regional Airport
 KGJT-CD, a low-power television station (channel 27) licensed to Grand Junction, Colorado, United States